The Pine Bloom Plantation, also known as Pinebloom Plantation, is a historic site in Newton, Georgia. It was added to the National Register of Historic Places on February 9, 1990. It is located on Tarva Road and County Route 122, 3/4 of a mile south of the Baker County, Georgia/ Dougherty County, Georgia line in Baker County. The site includes Greek Revival architecture, is associated with Gov. Alfred Holt Colquitt, and dates to about 1850. The plantation was purchased by billionaire John M. Harbert of Birmingham, Alabama in 1981.

The property included two contributing buildings and 16 non-contributing buildings and structures, including a modern skeet range.  The main plantation house is a one-story raised wood-frame U-shaped building with Greek Revival detailing built in about 1850.  It has a columned front portico and a hipped roof.

See also
National Register of Historic Places listings in Baker County, Georgia

References

Houses on the National Register of Historic Places in Georgia (U.S. state)
Houses in Baker County, Georgia
Houses completed in 1850
Greek Revival houses in Georgia (U.S. state)
Plantations in Georgia (U.S. state)
Historic districts on the National Register of Historic Places in Georgia (U.S. state)
National Register of Historic Places in Baker County, Georgia
Harbert family